Nong Khiaw (also Nong Kiau), is a village in the Laotian province of Luang Prabang.

Overview
Nong Khiaw is a popular tourist destination because of the walking and cycling routes near the village and the mountain-climbing opportunities. The only good way to get there used to be by boat from Luang Prabang or Muang Khua, near the Vietnamese border. This is not the case anymore due to the construction of dams on the Nam Ou river since 2017. There is also a road from Pak Mong to Hat Sao. The village is well known in Laos because of the bridge, which was given by China, that connects the two parts of the town. The bridge gives you a great view of the Nam Ou river, and the breathtaking rocks, mountains and hills around it.

References

External links

 Photos of Nong Khiaw

Populated places in Luang Prabang Province